Bouchetispira vitrea is a species of sea snail.

Description
The specific name vitrea is from the Latin word , which means "glass", referring to the translucent appearance of the shell.

Distribution
The species was found on an isolated seamount off New Caledonia, and is probably a survivor of a larger clade.

References

Bouchetispiridae